The 2023 Interwetten German Darts Grand Prix will be the fourth of thirteen PDC European Tour events on the 2023 PDC Pro Tour. The tournament will take place at the Kulturhalle Zenith, Munich, Germany from 8–10 April 2023. It will feature a field of 48 players and £175,000 in prize money, with £30,000 going to the winner.

The defending champion is Luke Humphries, who defeated Martin Lukeman 8–2 in the 2022 final.

Prize money
The prize money was increased for the first time in 4 years for all European Tours:

 Seeded players who lose in the second round of the event shall not be credited with prize money on any Order of Merit. A player who qualifies as a qualifier, but later becomes a seed due to the withdrawal of one or more other players shall be credited with their prize money on all Orders of Merit regardless of how far they progress in the event.

Qualification and format
The top 16 entrants from the PDC ProTour Order of Merit on 15 February 2023 automatically qualified for the event and were seeded in the second round.

The remaining 32 places went to players from six qualifying events – 24 from the Tour Card Holder Qualifier (held on 20 February), two from the Associate Member Qualifier (held on 11 February), the two highest ranked Germans automatically qualified, alongside two from the Host Nation Qualifier (held on 11 February), one from the Nordic & Baltic Associate Member Qualifier (held on 10 March), and one from the East European Associate Member Qualifier (held on 12 February).

The following players will take part in the tournament:

Top 16
 
 
 
 
 
 
 
 
 
 
 
 
 
 
 
 

Tour Card Qualifier
 
 
 
 
 
 
 
 
 
 
 
 
 
 
 
 
 
 
 
 
 
 
 
 

Associate Member Qualifier
 
 

Highest Ranking Germans
 
 

Host Nation Qualifier
 
 

Nordic & Baltic Qualifier
 

East European Qualifier

Draw

Notes

References

2023 PDC Pro Tour
2023 PDC European Tour
2023 in German sport
German Darts Grand Prix